William Lindsay Beattie ( – 27 January 1917) was a Scottish professional rugby league footballer who played in the 1910s. He played at club level for Wakefield Trinity (Heritage No. 192) (captain), as a forward (prior to the specialist positions of), during the era of contested scrums, and was invited to join the 1914 Great Britain Lions tour of Australia and New Zealand, but declined due to business reasons. Beattie served as a commissioned officer with the Border Regiment (initially in the 10th (service) battalion), and latterly in the 1st battalion (ex 34th Foot), and was killed on the Western Front in 1917 during World War I.

Playing career

Challenge Cup Final appearances
Billy Beattie played as a forward, i.e. number 10, in Wakefield Trinity's 0–6 defeat by Hull F.C. in the 1914 Challenge Cup Final during the 1913–14 season at Thrum Hall, Halifax, in front of a crowd of 19,000.

Club career
Billy Beattie made his début for Wakefield Trinity during December 1911, and he played his last match for Wakefield Trinity during October 1914, he appears to have scored no drop-goals (or field-goals as they are currently known in Australasia), but prior to the 1974–75 season all goals, whether; conversions, penalties, or drop-goals, scored 2-points, consequently prior to this date drop-goals were often not explicitly documented, therefore '0' drop-goals may indicate drop-goals not recorded, rather than no drop-goals scored. In addition, prior to the 1949–50 season, the archaic field-goal was also still a valid means of scoring points.

References

External links
Search for "Beattie" at rugbyleagueproject.org

1880s births
1917 deaths
Border Regiment officers
British Army personnel of World War I
British military personnel killed in World War I
Rugby league forwards
Rugby league players from Aberdeenshire
Scottish rugby league players
Wakefield Trinity captains
Wakefield Trinity players